Matt Anthony Field is a 675-seat multi-purpose stadium located on the University of Ottawa campus in Ottawa, Ontario. The stadium is home to the Ottawa Gee-Gees varsity women's soccer and rugby teams as well as the men's competitive club soccer and rugby teams. 

The facility was named in honour of Matt Anthony, a prominent figure in the Ottawa football community, playing for the Ottawa Rough Riders and later coaching the Gee-Gees as well as junior and high school football.

Matt Anthony Field was renovated in 2011, the field surface was updated to FieldTurf Revolution, which was the first of its kind in Canada and only the second field with the artificial turf in North America.

The facility holds a FIFA-recommended 2-Star designation, the highest synthetic turf rating possible. It is one of only approximately 20 FIFA 2-star fields in Canada.

Ottawa Gee-Gees
University of Ottawa
Multi-purpose stadiums in Canada
2001 establishments in Ontario
Sports venues completed in 2001
Soccer venues in Ontario
Rugby union stadiums in Ontario
Canadian football venues in Ontario
College football venues